State Highway 368 (SH 368) is a  state highway in Rio Grande, Conejos, and Alamosa counties in Colorado United States, that connects Colorado State Highway 370 (SH 370) west of Waverly with U.S. Route 285 (US 285) in Estrella.

Route description
(SH 370 heads east toward US 285 and Alamosa. SH 370 heads west toward Colorado State Highway 15 [SH 15] and Monte Vista. CR 4E heads north toward the Monte Vista National Wildlife Refuge.)

Continuing due south for about another , SH 368 curves to head due east, with a junction with the north end of County Road 10 in the middle of the curve at a T intersection. (CR 13S heads briefly east, while CR 12 heads north toward Waverly.)

(SH 371 heads south toward Capulin and La Jara while CR DD heads west toward SH 15.)

(US 285 heads north toward Alamosa and south toward La Jara and Antonito, while CR 14S heads briefly east.)

Major intersections

See also

 List of state highways in Colorado

References

External links

368
Transportation in Rio Grande County, Colorado
Transportation in Conejos County, Colorado
Transportation in Alamosa County, Colorado